The 1972 United States presidential election in New Jersey took place on November 7, 1972. All 50 states and the District of Columbia were part of the 1972 United States presidential election. Voters chose 17 electors to the Electoral College, which selected the president and vice president.

New Jersey was won by the Republican nominees, incumbent President Richard Nixon of California and his running mate incumbent Vice President Spiro Agnew of Maryland. Nixon and Agnew defeated the Democratic nominees, Senator George McGovern of South Dakota and his running mate United States Ambassador Sargent Shriver of Maryland.

Nixon carried New Jersey with 61.57% to McGovern's 36.77%, a margin of 24.80%. 

Nixon swept every county in New Jersey, including even traditional Democratic strongholds like Essex County, Mercer County, and Hudson County. Nixon's unique nationwide appeal to working-class Democrats in 1972 was most evident in his performance in Hudson County; the traditionally heavily Democratic county, which Nixon had lost decisively with less than forty percent of the vote in both 1960 and 1968, went to Nixon in 1972 by a 60–39 margin. This remains the last election in which a Republican presidential nominee has won Essex County, although it was still McGovern's strongest, only narrowly going to Nixon by a 50–48 margin. Mercer County was the second-closest, with Nixon winning it, 52–47. Nixon's strongest county was rural Sussex County, where he received 74% of the vote.

New Jersey in this era was a swing state with a slight Republican lean, and this pattern continued with the results of 1972. In the midst of a nationwide Republican landslide, New Jersey voted basically how the nation voted, its result being 1.6% more Republican than the national average.

This was the third time in five presidential elections (1956–72) that the winning candidate swept New Jersey's counties in an election, having also happened in 1956 and 1964. It had only happened once before, when Warren G. Harding achieved it in 1920 and, as of 2020, has not happened since.

Results

Results by county

See also
 United States presidential elections in New Jersey
 Presidency of Richard Nixon
 Presidency of Gerald Ford
 The Watergate Scandal

References

New Jersey
1972
1972 New Jersey elections